Fenn is an unincorporated community in Idaho County, Idaho, United States. Fenn had a post office with ZIP code 

Originally Tharp, it was named in 1915 (or earlier) after the Fenn family. Stephen S. Fenn (1820–92) arrived in Florence from California in 1862 with his wife and four children. He was an early settler, attorney, administrator, speaker of territorial legislature, and a territorial delegate to Congress. His son, Major Frank A. Fenn  also of many professions, was the speaker of the first state legislature. Frank's son Lloyd (1884–1953) also served in the 

An earlier settlement a few miles north, Denver, was mostly abandoned after the Camas Prairie Railroad bypassed it. A grain elevator was constructed in Fenn in 1918, and an upgrade was added in 1946, served by the railroad until the abandonment of its Second Subdivision line to Grangeville in late 2000.

Fenn's population was 25 in 1960.

Climate

According to the Köppen Climate Classification system, Fenn has an oceanic climate, abbreviated "Cfb" on climate maps.

Notable people
James Henry Meyer, Chancellor of the University of California, Davis, from 1969 to 1987

References

Unincorporated communities in Idaho County, Idaho
Unincorporated communities in Idaho